If We May is an album jazz standards by pianist Paul Bley recorded in 1993 and released on the SteepleChase label.

Reception

Allmusic awarded the album 4 stars, stating, "The music is quite accessible to straightahead fans even if Bley gives these warhorses some new twists, and he shows that he can swing with the best of them (not that anyone really doubted it)".

Track listing
 "Long Ago (And Far Away)" (Ira Gershwin, Jerome Kern) - 9:36	
 "Don't Explain" (Billie Holiday, Arthur Herzog, Jr.) - 9:43	
 "If We May" (Paul Bley) - 10:08	
 "Indian Summer" (Al Dubin, Victor Herbert) - 5:59	
 "All the Things You Are" (Oscar Hammerstein II, Jerome Kern) - 9:26	
 "Goodbye" (Gordon Jenkins) - 5:12
 "Confirmation" (Charlie Parker) - 5:55

Personnel 
Paul Bley - piano
Jay Anderson - bass 
Adam Nussbaum - drums

References 

1994 albums
Paul Bley albums
SteepleChase Records albums